Hynobius ikioi is a species of salamander in the family Hynobiidae, endemic to Kyushu in Japan.

Physical characteristics
Hynobius ikioi is very close to Hynobius amakusaensis and Hynobius osumiensis, both also from Kyushu, but is easily distinguished from them by its uniquely bi-colored dorsum.

Taxonomy
This species was described in 2017 by Matsui, Nishikawa & Tominanga; it was previously thought to be a population of Hynobius stejnegeri.

References

ikioi
Endemic amphibians of Japan
Amphibians described in 2017
Taxa named by Masafumi Matsui
Taxa named by Kanto Nishikawa
Taxa named by Atsushi Tominaga